GuildHE represents 57 higher education institutions in the UK, including universities, university colleges, further education colleges and specialist institutions. Member institutions include some major providers in professional subject areas including art, design and media; music and the performing arts; agriculture and food; education; law; business and management; construction; and health and sports. GuildHE is a formal representative body, alongside Universities UK and the Association of Colleges and is one of two bodies for higher education in the UK.

The Chair of GuildHE is Anthony McClaran the Vice Chancellor of St Mary's University, Twickenham.

It is a company limited by guarantee and a charity. It was founded in the late 1970s as the Standing Conference of Principals, registered as a company in 1992 and was renamed as GuildHE in 2006.

Members
Full Members

Associate Members

References

External links
Official Website
List of members from official website

Higher education in the United Kingdom
Organizations established in 1978
Universities in the United Kingdom
College and university associations and consortia in the United Kingdom
1978 establishments in the United Kingdom